Rai Mansab Ali Khan (13 September 1938 - 14 January 2015) was a Pakistani politician who started his political career in 1962 as the youngest ever MPA at the age of 25 in Field Marshal Ayub Khan's government. He was a member of the Majlis-i-Shura of General Zia-ul-Haq and was elected MNA National Assembly of Pakistan many times: from 1985 to 1987, 1990 to 1992,1995 to 1997,2002 to 2007, and from June 2013 to January 2015.

Early life and education
Rai Mansab Ali Khan Kharral was born on September 13, 1938, in Nankana Sahib. According to another report, he was born on 15 September 1938.

He completed his law degree from University of the Punjab in 1960.
He was a man of letters and was well-known and admired in literary circles. He wrote poetry, essays and opinion pieces in Urdu and Punjabi. He was known as a great patron of both languages and several magazines, quarterlies and annual risalas and journals ran because of his patronage. One of his best friends was Maskoor Hussain Yaad, the famous poet and writer of Urdu.

Political career
Rai Mansab Ali Khan Kharral was elected to the 1962 assembly of Field Marshal Ayub Khan. Then as member of Majlis-i-Shura of General Zia-ul-Haq. Then as MNA of Pakistan National Assembly in 1985 as a Pakistan Muslim League candidate. Then again in 1990 as MNA of Pakistan National Assembly as  candidate of Pakistan Muslim League N and then again National Assembly of Pakistan as a candidate of Pakistan Muslim League (Q) (PML-Q) from Constituency NA-137 (Sheikhupura-VII) in 2002 Pakistani general election. He received 61,506 votes and defeated Muhammad Nisar Ahmed Khan, a candidate of Pakistan Peoples Party (PPP).

He ran for the seat of the National Assembly as a candidate of Pakistan Muslim League (N) (PML-N) from Constituency NA-137 (Sheikhupura-VII) in 2008 Pakistani general election but was unsuccessful. He received 44,745 votes and lost the seat to Saeed Ahmed Zafar.

He was re-elected to the National Assembly as a candidate of PML-N from Constituency NA-137 (Sheikhupura-VII) in 2013 Pakistani general election. He received 61,329 votes and defeated an independent candidate, Ijaz Ahmed Shah.

Death
He died on 14 January 2015 in Nankana Sahib due to heart attack.

References

1938 births
Pakistan Muslim League (N) MNAs
Punjabi people
Pakistani MNAs 2013–2018
People from Nankana Sahib District
2015 deaths
Pakistan Muslim League (Q) MNAs
University of the Punjab alumni
Pakistani MNAs 2002–2007